Bound state in the continuum (BIC)   - is an eigenstate of some particular quantum system with the following properties:

 Energy lies in the continuous spectrum of propagating modes of the surrounding space;
 The state does not interact with any of the states of the continuum (it cannot emit and cannot be excited by any wave that came from the infinity); 
 Energy is real and Q factor is infinite, if there is no absorption in the system.

BICs are observed in electronic, photonic, acoustic systems. Bound states in the forbidden zone, where there are no finite solutions at infinity, are widely known (atoms, quantum dots, defects in semiconductors). For solutions in a continuum that are associated with this continuum, resonant states  are known, which decay (lose energy) over time. They can be excited, for example, by an incident wave with the same energy. The bound states in the continuum have real energy eigenvalues and therefore do not interact with the states of the continuous spectrum and cannot decay.

Wigner-Von Neumann BICs 
Bound states in the continuum were first predicted in 1929 by Eugene Wigner and John von Neumann. Two potentials were described, in which BICs appear for two different reasons.

In this work, a spherically symmetric wave function is first chosen so as to be quadratically integrable over the entire space. Then a potential is chosen such that this wave function corresponds to zero energy.

The potential is spherically symmetric, then the wave equation will be written as follows:

 

the angle derivatives disappear, since we limit ourselves to considering only spherically symmetric wave functions:

 

For  to be the eigenvalue for the spherically symmetric wave function , the potential must be

 .

First case 

Let us consider the function . While the integral  must be finite, then considering the behavior when , we get that , then considering the behavior when  , we get . The regularity  in  requires . Finally, we get .

Assuming , then the potential will be equal to (discarding the irrelevant multiplier ):

 

The eigenfunction and the potential curve are shown in the figure.

In the work   is given the following interpretation: this behavior can be understood from an analogy with classical mechanics (considerations belong to Leo Szilard). The motion of a material point in the potential  is described by the following equation:

 

 

  

that is, for a finite time  the point goes to infinity. The stationary solution  means that the point returns from infinity again, that it is as if it is reflected from there and starts oscillating. The fact that  at  tends to zero follows from the fact that it rolls down a large potential slide and has an enormous speed and therefore a short lifetime.

Second case 

Let's move on to the second example, which can no longer be interpreted from such considerations.

First of all, we take a function , then . These are divergent spherical waves, since the energy  is greater than the potential , the classical kinetic energy remains positive. The wave function belongs to a continuous spectrum, the integral  diverges. Let's try to change the wave function so that the quadratic integral converges and the potential varies near -1.

Consider the following ansatz:

 

If the function  is continuous, and at  the asymptotic is  then the integral is finite. The potential would then be equal (with the corrected arithmetical error in the original article):

 

In order for the potential to remain near -1, and at  tend to -1, we must make the functions  small and at  tend to zero.

This is the case when  or any other function of this expression.

Let assume , where  is arbitrary (here   tends to  when ). Then

 

The expression for the potential is cumbersome, but the graphs show that for  the potential tends to -1.
We can see that the potential oscillates with period  and the wave function oscillates with period . It turns out that all reflected waves from the "humps" of such a potential are in phase, and the function is localized in the center, being reflected from the potential by a mechanism similar to the reflection from a Bragg mirror.

Notes

Literature 

 Hsu C., Zhen B., Stone A.D., Joannopoulos J.D., Soljačić M. Bound states in the continuum // Nature Reviews Materials. — 2016. — Vol. 1. — P. 16048. — doi:10.1038/natrevmats.2016.48.
 Koshelev K., Bogdanov A., Kivshar Yu. Engineering with Bound States in the Continuum // Optics and Photonics News. — 2020. — Vol. 31, No. 1. — P. 38–45. — doi:10.1364/OPN.31.1.000038.
 Azzam S.I., Kildishev A.V. Photonic Bound States in the Continuum: From Basics to Applications // Advanced Optical Materials. — 2020. — P. 2001469. — doi:10.1002/adom.202001469.
 Sadreev A.F. Interference traps waves in open system: Bound states in the continuum. — 2020. — arXiv:2011.01221.

Waves
Quantum optics